United Airways Ltd was a British airline operating in 1935, ending as part of British Airways Ltd.

History
Whitehall Securities Corporation was a wealthy investment company run by Clive Pearson, the son of the founder. He was interested in aviation, and invested in Metal Propellers Ltd in 1925, and in Airwork Ltd in 1929. He also invested in Simonds Aircraft in 1928, renaming it Spartan Aircraft Ltd in 1930. Pearson then took a 50% share in Saunders-Roe (SARO) and combined the two companies to produce the Spartan Cruiser airliner. To promote the Cruiser Pearson founded Spartan Air Lines on 2 February 1933, which on 12 April started services from Heston Aerodrome to the Isle of Wight.

Meanwhile, Walter Thurgood was making good profits with Jersey Airways, and was starting another airline, Guernsey Airways. On 1 December 1934, Pearson, along with Great Western Railway and Southern Railway formed a holding company called Channel Islands Airways Ltd to control both airlines, with Whitehall Securities and Thurgood holding two thirds of the shares.

Wanting to expand northwards. Pearson then founded United Airways on 4 April 1935 through Channel Islands Airways, with Thurgood in charge. The fleet was to consist of several Spartan Cruisers from Spartan Air Lines, and newly-ordered de Havilland Dragon Rapides, all of which held six to eight passengers. There were also some pleasure-flying aircraft which would be particularly popular at Blackpool in the coming holiday season.

On 30 April United started services from Spartan’s base at Heston to Blackpool and onwards to the Isle of Man and Carlisle (Kingstown Municipal Airport), with a link by Northern & Scottish Airways (N&SA) from the Isle of Man to Glasgow. In May, Whitehall took a controlling interest in N&SA, and although United included its Western Isles routes as an associate airline, it was never formally part of United. In June 1935 United did take Highland Airways under its wing, but it retained its own identity and a degree of independence.

On 18 June United Airways operated daily services between Blackpool and Leeds, the Isle of Man and Liverpool, and Blackpool and Morecambe. United had taken over the lease of Blackpool's Stanley Park Aerodrome and were running it for the town's Corporation. They were also in talks with the independent Hillman's Airways to run services from London to Amsterdam and Berlin and possibly to Norway.

United Airways lasted less than five months, until 30 September 1935, when under Pearson’s command, Spartan and United along with Hillman's Airways, all combined into one new company, Allied British Airways. That itself only lasted one month, as it was renamed British Airways Ltd on 29 October, and it became a public company on 11 December.

Routes
United Airways routes as in timetable dated 18 June 1935. "In conjunction with Northern & Scottish Airways" and "Connections available with Isle of Wight and Jersey air services".

 Heston — Blackpool — Isle of Man (twice daily)
 Isle of Man — Blackpool — Liverpool (thrice daily)
 Isle of Man — Blackpool — Morecambe (twice daily)
 Blackpool — Leeds (daily)
 Isle of Man — Carlisle (daily, twice on Saturdays)
 Isle of Man — Glasgow (N&SA - daily)
 Glasgow — Campbeltown — Islay (N&SA - daily)

Fleet list

Two further Rapides were originally registered to United Airways, G-ADBV and G-ADBW, but never delivered; they were diverted to Jersey Airways.

The fleet livery was plain silver or white with red markings.

Accidents and incidents
There are no recorded accidents or incidents to United Airways aircraft.

See also
 List of defunct airlines of the United Kingdom

References

Defunct airlines of the United Kingdom
Airlines disestablished in 1935
Airlines established in 1935
1935 establishments in England
1935 disestablishments in England
1935 mergers and acquisitions